The Spartanburg Memorial Auditorium is a large-events venue in Spartanburg, South Carolina, located at 385 N Church St.  It was built in 1951 and consists of a 3,217-seat theater with an 83'9"-by-86' stage and a 1,600-seat Exhibit Hall with 13,638 square feet (Dimensions: 83.5'-by-163'4") of exhibit space.

The auditorium, with 2,017 seats on the lower level and 1,200 in the two balconies (834 lower balcony and 366 upper balcony seats), is used for concerts, stage and family shows, and other events, and is one of South Carolina's largest theaters.  The arena is used for concerts, trade shows, banquets, wrestling, and other events.

The Auditorium has hosted The Supremes in '62, Ray Charles in '68 and '97, Billy Joel in '77, Black Crowes in '92, Billy Ray Cyrus in '95, Dave Matthews in '97, 3 Doors Down in '01, country singer Aaron Tippin (from Travelers Rest) in '03, Taylor Swift in '08, Jerry Seinfeld in '10, The Fray with Colbie Caillat and Michelle Branch in '11, and Halestorm in '16.

Concert halls in the United States
Convention centers in the United States
Event venues in South Carolina
Sports venues in South Carolina
Indoor arenas in South Carolina
Buildings and structures in Spartanburg, South Carolina
Sports venues in Spartanburg County, South Carolina